Farouk Muhammad (Bima, West Nusa Tenggara, 17 October 1949  Jakarta, 18 February 2021) was an Indonesian police officer and politician. He was Deputy Chair of the Regional Representative Council for the 2014–2017 period from the electoral district of West Nusa Tenggara. He was a Polri officer with his last position as Governor of the Police Science College.

References

Indonesian politicians
1949 births
2021 deaths
People from Bima Regency